Stef Gronsveld (born 11 January 1996) is a Dutch former footballer who played as a right back.

Club career
Born in Delft, Gronsveld started his youth career with the academy of local Vitesse Delft. In April 2014, he joined the academy of Feyenoord. In June 2015, he was promoted to the senior team and was issued the 25 number jersey. He made his debut in a pre-season friendly game against Heerenveen, but was suffered a hamstring injury in the first half and was ruled out of play for almost the entire season. He managed to recover in the following April.

After having played no competitive match for Feyenoord, Gronsveld joined FC Emmen on a two-year deal on 10 June 2016. However, in the following month, it was announced that he had undergone a hip surgery and was ruled out of play for four months. On 13 January 2018, he made his first team debut against FC Eindhoven. On 9 May 2018, his contract was extended for another year.

After playing for FC Dordrecht in the 2019–20 season and missing the second half of the season due to hip injury, he retired from playing football to continue his education.

Career statistics

References

External links
 

1996 births
Living people
Association football defenders
Dutch footballers
Feyenoord players
FC Emmen players
FC Dordrecht players
Eredivisie players
Eerste Divisie players
Footballers from Delft